Meliorism (Latin melior, better) is the idea that progress is a real concept leading to an improvement of the world. It holds that humans can, through their interference with processes that would otherwise be natural, produce an outcome which is an improvement over the aforementioned natural one.

Meliorism, as a conception of the person and society, is at the foundation of contemporary liberal democracy and human rights and is a basic component of liberalism.

Another important understanding of the meliorist tradition comes from the American Pragmatic tradition.  One can read about it in the works of Lester Frank Ward, William James, and John Dewey. In James' works, however, meliorism does not pinpoint to progressivism and/or optimism. For James, meliorism stands in the middle between optimism and pessimism, and treats the salvation of the world as a probability rather than a certainty or impossibility. In the case of a meliorist praxis, the activist contemporary of the Pragmatists Jane Addams  stripped progressive ideals of any elitist privilege calling for a "lateral progress" whose concern was squarely with the common people.

Meliorism has also been used by Arthur Caplan to describe positions in bioethics that are in favor of ameliorating conditions which cause suffering, even if the conditions have long existed (e.g. being in favor of cures for common diseases, being in favor of serious anti-aging therapies as they are developed).

A closely related concept discussed by Jean-Jacques Rousseau and Marquis de Condorcet is that of perfectibility of man. 

Condorcet's statement, "Such is the object of the work I have undertaken; the result of which will be to show, from reasoning and from facts, that no bounds have been fixed to the improvement of the human faculties; that the perfectibility of man is absolutely indefinite; that the progress of this perfectibility, henceforth above the control of every power that would impede it, has no other limit than the duration of the globe upon which nature has placed us." anticipates James' meliorism.

Rousseau's treatment is somewhat weaker.

Modern thinkers in this tradition are Hans Rosling and Max Roser. Roser expressed a melioristic position in the mission statement for Our World in Data. He said that all three statements are true at the same time "The world is much better. The world is awful. The world can be much better." Like William James before him Rosling held a halfway position between optimism and pessimism that emphasized humanity's capacity to improve their world.

See also
 Antinaturalism (sociology)
 Extropianism
 Idea of Progress
 Techno-progressivism
 Teleology
 The Ultimate Resource
 Transhumanism
 Whig history

References

External links

 Graebner, Norman, "The Limits of Meliorism in Foreign Affairs", Virginia Quarterly Review, Winter 2000

Change
Metaphysical theories
Progress
Linear theories